Matthey is a surname. Notable people with the surname include:

 Arthur Matthey, pseudonym of the French writer Arthur Arnould
 Francis Matthey (born 1942), Swiss politician 
 Giles Matthey (born 1987), British actor
 Jeanne Matthey (1886–1980), French tennis player
 Magdalena Matthey (born 1971), Chilean singer-songwriter
 Maurice Matthey, Swiss rower

See also
 Johnson Matthey, British company